Tzernicus was the ancient name of an area in northern Albania, eventually part of the medieval Bosnian region.

Tzernicus, also known as Cerminic, is also a titular see of the Roman Catholic Church centered on the ancient city of Çermenikë and belonged to the ecclesiastical province of Achrida in Ohrid, North Macedonia.

Bishops
Michael Rusnak (1964.08.25 – 1980.10.13)
Jožef Smej (1983.04.15 – 2020.11.21)

References

Catholic titular sees in Europe